Snapper Ledge is a small coral reef located within the Florida Keys National Marine Sanctuary. It lies to the southeast of Key Largo, to the south the Key Largo Existing Management Area and John Pennekamp Coral Reef State Park.  Unlike many reefs within the Sanctuary, this reef is not within a Sanctuary Preservation Area (SPA).  It is near Pickles Reef.  Since 2009, the Coral Restoration Foundation has used Snapper Ledge as a nursery site to grow Elkhorn Coral.

Gallery

References
 NOAA National Marine Sanctuary Maps, Florida Keys East
 NOAA Map of Buoys at Snapper Ledge and Pickles Reef
 The Coral Restoration Foundation's description of their Elkhorn coral program at Snapper Ledge
 photos of CFR's elkhorn coral nursery at Snapper Ledge

Coral reefs of the Florida Keys